Ruby Tjangawa Williamson was a Pitjantjatjara artist from Amaṯa, in central Australia. She made acrylic paintings and traditional wood carvings, and was one of the most successful artists from the region. Her paintings have attracted critical acclaim for her unusually modern style. Ruby painted sacred stories from the Dreamtime that have morals or lessons from her people's traditional law. She used the typical style of the Western Desert, but the techniques and imagery were more modern. Her style is said to be experimental.

Ruby was a member of the Pitjantjatjara nation. She was born about 1940, at a sacred site near Kata Ala, Western Australia. She grew up with her family in the bushland along the western side of the border with South Australia. Her family spent most of their time travelling between her father's homeland near Pukara and her mother's around Mantamaru. When Ruby was a teenager, they followed other Pitjantjatjara families to settle at Ernabella, far to the east. Ruby grew up and went to school at the mission there until she got married.

Ruby's husband was a stockman whose family came from what is now Amaṯa, west of Ernabella. After they got married, they moved north to Areyonga, where he worked on the cattle station. They later moved back to his homeland, where he got a job on the Musgrave Park station. They had five children together, before her husband died in his early 40s.

In 1999, the senior women of Amaṯa, including Ruby, founded Minymaku Arts (it is now called Tjala Arts). Ruby began working there herself in 2000. Her first solo exhibitions were in Hobart in 2003 and 2005, and then in Melbourne in 2008. Her artwork has been shown alongside works by other Tjala artists in every major city in Australia. She has also had her work shown in group exhibitions in Singapore and the United States. Her work is held in the National Gallery of Victoria, the Art Gallery of South Australia, the Queensland Art Gallery, the National Gallery of Australia, and the Museum and Art Gallery of the Northern Territory. She died in 2014.

References

More reading

1940s births
Living people
Australian painters
Indigenous Australian artists
Pitjantjatjara people
Australian women painters
20th-century Australian women artists
20th-century Australian artists
21st-century Australian women artists
21st-century Australian artists